Elections were held in Lambton County, Ontario on October 27, 2014 in conjunction with municipal elections across the province.

Lambton County Council
County council includes the mayors of each constituent municipality, the deputy mayors of Lambton Shores and St. Clair plus four city councillors from Sarnia.

Brooke-Alvinston

Dawn-Euphemia

Enniskillen

Lambton Shores

Oil Springs

Petrolia

Plympton-Wyoming

Point Edward

Sarnia

St. Clair

Warwick

References
 

Lambton
Lambton County